Gary Armstrong is the name of

 Gary Armstrong (athlete) (born 1952), British sprinter, participated in the 1972 Summer Olympics
 Gary Armstrong (footballer) (born 1958), English association football player
 Gary Armstrong (cricketer) (born 1965), Bahamian cricketer
 Gary Armstrong (rugby union) (born 1966), Scottish rugby union player